Conference of Western Balkan States was a 28 August 2014 conference of heads of states and governments of Western Balkans region initiated by German chancellor Angela Merkel. An idea for organization of conference came in light of the celebration of the 100th anniversary of the beginning of World War I. It is the first conference in this framework and organizers expressed their desire to continue it in future with Vienna and Paris mentioned as a potential next hosts after Berlin (so called Berlin Process). Günther Oettinger confirmed at conference that event will be organised annually with Vienna as a host city in 2015 and Paris in 2016.

The German chancellor announced intention to organize a conference on 7 June 2014. Invitation for participation was sent to all the countries of South Eastern Europe including Croatia and Slovenia that were already members of the European Union at the time of conference.

The main intention was to show commitment for process of Future enlargement of the European Union, little progress of Bosnia and Herzegovina and Macedonia in that process and relations of Serbia with Russia in the light of International sanctions during the 2014 pro-Russian unrest in Ukraine.

During the Foreign Ministers’ segment, Albanian Foreign Minister Bushati underlined the importance of making this initiative periodical, as well as finding the right instruments to enable, in future years, the drafting and implementation of concrete joint projects in the region. In this regard Albanian delegation presented a document under the title "Albanian Working Paper for the Western Balkans Conference in Berlin", which is based in the vision of "a region in peace and well prepared to join the European Union, by guarantying a dignified living for all its citizens."

At conference was announced future visit of Albanian Prime Minister Edi Rama to Serbia. It will be the first meeting of this type between two countries after 1947 meeting of Enver Hoxha with President of Yugoslavia Josip Broz Tito. However, an incident during a football match in Belgrade has cast doubt on this visit. Edi Rama eventually visited Serbia on 10 November 2014 to meet his Serbian counterpart but tempers flared when Rama said that Kosovo's independence was "undeniable" and "must be respected" and Serbian Prime Minister Aleksandar Vučić accused him of a "provocation".

Franz Lothar Altmann, expert on the Balkans, stated in his pre-conference interview for Radio Free Europe/Radio Liberty that conference proves increasing importance of Balkan region, especially with respect to the Russo-Ukrainian War.

Regional activities before conference

Prime ministers of Serbia Aleksandar Vučić and Deputy Chair of the Bosnia-Herzegovina Council of Ministers of Bosnia Zlatko Lagumdžija met in Belgrade on 20 August to agree on joint projects that two countries will present in Berlin. Serbian delegation also announced its intention seek support for infrastructure projectof modernization of the Belgrade–Bar railway.

On 25 August 2014 Prime ministers of Croatia, Montenegro, Bosnia and Herzegovina, and Albania meet prior to conference in Croatian town of Cavtat. Prime ministers exchange views on infrastructure projects and other topics of common interest which may be discussed at conference.

Croatia announced its intention to seek support for construction of section of Adriatic–Ionian motorway along the coast conditional on it receiving EU funds for the Pelješac Bridge.

On 2014 Croatia Summit Aleksei Meshkov, Russian Deputy Foreign Minister, said that European Union should not push the Western Balkan States to select EU or Russia.

Participants of conference

 José Manuel Barroso, president of the European Commission
 Štefan Füle, European Commissioner for Enlargement and European Neighbourhood Policy
 Günther Oettinger, European Commission Vice President
 Angela Merkel
 Sigmar Gabriel, Minister for Economic Affairs and Energy and Vice Chancellor of Germany
 Frank-Walter Steinmeier, Minister for Foreign Affairs of Germany
 Werner Faymann, Chancellor of Austria
 Reinhold Mitterlehner, Austrian federal minister of economy
 Sebastian Kurz, Minister for Foreign Affairs of Austria
 Aleksandar Vučić,  Prime Minister of Serbia
 Ivica Dačić, Minister of Foreign Affairs of Serbia
 Zoran Milanović, Prime Minister of Croatia
 Vesna Pusić, Minister of Foreign and European Affairs of Croatia
 Ivan Vrdoljak, Minister of Economy of Croatia
 Alenka Bratušek,  Prime Minister of Slovenia
 Karl Erjavec,  Minister of Foreign Affairs of Slovenia
 Metod Dragonja,  Minister of Economic Development and Technology of Slovenia
 Milo Đukanović, Prime Minister of Montenegro
 Igor Lukšić, Minister of Foreign Affairs
 Vladimir Kavarić, Minister of Economy of Montenegro
 Vjekoslav Bevanda, Chairman of the Council of Ministers of Bosnia and Herzegovina
 Zlatko Lagumdžija, Deputy Chairman of the Council of Ministers of Bosnia and Herzegovina
 Boris Tučić, Minister of Foreign trade and economic relations
 Edi Rama, Prime Minister of Albania
 Ditmir Bushati, Minister of Foreign Affairs of Albania
 Nikola Gruevski, Prime Minister of Macedonia
 Vladimir Peševski, Deputy Prime Minister
 Bekim Neziri
 Hashim Thaçi, Prime Minister of Republic of Kosovo

Notes and references
Notes:

References:

See also
Berlin Process
Southeast Europe
Treaty of Berlin (1878)
Croatia Summit
Igman Initiative
Stabilisation and Association Process
Central European Free Trade Agreement
Stability Pact for South Eastern Europe
South-East European Cooperation Process
Regional Cooperation Council
Southeast European Cooperative Initiative
Russia in the European energy sector

External links
 Final Declaration by the Chair of the Conference on the Western Balkans, Berlin, 28 August 2014
 The EU integration Office of Serbia
 Secretariat for European Affairs of Macedonia
 Delegation of the European Union to Albania

2014 in politics
Diplomatic conferences in Germany
21st-century diplomatic conferences (Europe)
2014 in international relations
2014 conferences
Foreign relations of Croatia
Foreign relations of Albania
Foreign relations of Bosnia and Herzegovina
Foreign relations of Kosovo
Foreign relations of North Macedonia
Foreign relations of Montenegro
Foreign relations of Serbia
Foreign relations of Slovenia
International relations in Southeastern Europe
Contemplated enlargements of the European Union
2014 in Berlin
August 2014 events in Germany